Wire Pass Trailhead is a recreation access point in Kane County, Utah that features several trails leading to natural points of interest.

Description 
The trailhead is located in Paria Canyon–Vermilion Cliffs Wilderness Area of southern Utah and northern Arizona, about halfway between Kanab, Utah and Page, Arizona.

From this trailhead, some of the hike options are the North Coyote Buttes to the famous Wave, to Wire Pass Narrows and onward to Buckskin Gulch.

The Bureau of Land Management (BLM) limits access to the North Coyote Buttes Wilderness Area to just 20 permits per day.  Ten of the permits are available in advance by reservation online, and the remaining ten are made available the day before at the Paria BLM Station from March 15 to November 14 or the Kanab BLM Field Office from November 15 to March 14.

The day hike to Wire Pass Narrows requires a $7 per person, per day fee paid at the trailhead. There is no permit system for this hike, and any number of users can hike to these narrows. The hike begins opposite the trailhead in the wash. Following the wash northward takes you to the Wire pass narrows and subsequently to Buckskin Gulch.

There is a pit toilet at the parking lot but no campsites. There is a campsite with pit toilet  further south down House Rock Valley Road.

External links

 Buckskin Gulch routes and trailheads
 

Hiking trails in Utah
Protected areas of Kane County, Utah